Guayama Futbol Club is a football team based in Guayama, Puerto Rico. Founded in 1959, the club plays in the Liga Puerto Rico.

History
The club was founded in 1959 as an amateur team, before later becoming a professional club. The club joined the premier division of Puerto Rican football, the Liga Nacional de Fútbol de Puerto Rico, in 2012.

The club was selected to participate internationally in the 1992 CONCACAF Champions' Cup against Rockmaster FC of the U.S. Virgin Islands, but withdrew before the tournament began.

Stadium
 Cancha Dr. Roberto Monroig; Guayama, Puerto Rico (19** – present)
 Guayama FC Stadium; Guayama, Puerto Rico (Under Construction)

Current squad
Current roster updated on January 4, 2017.   

Club Manager: Wilfredo 'Willie Boyer' Díaz
Technical Director: Julio Fernández Bou

References

Football clubs in Puerto Rico
1949 establishments in Puerto Rico
Liga Nacional de Fútbol de Puerto Rico teams
Association football clubs established in 1949
Guayama, Puerto Rico